Ziar Kola (also Romanized as Zīār Kolā) is a village in Talarpey Rural District, in the Central District of Simorgh County, Mazandaran Province, Iran. At the 2006 census, its population was 629, in 169 families.

References 

Populated places in Simorgh County